Anotylus tetracarinatus is a small rove beetle with a wide distribution. It is the most common species of the genus, and maybe even of the family, in the whole of Central Europe.

The beetles can cause severe pain if they come into contact with the human eye. This pain usually lasts for about ten minutes.

Description

Anotylus tetracarinatus reaches a length of 1.7 to 2.1 mm. The body is dark. The tibiae of the front legs are not sinuated at the tip. The abdomen of the males do not possess any protuberances.

The species develops in a variety of decaying materials. Often the imagines swarm in spring or early summer in great numbers, especially in the afternoons or evenings of warm days.

Distribution

Anotylus tetracarinatus was first described from Plauischer Grund near Dresden, but is found natively in Algeria, Europe, Russia, Turkey, Iran, United States and Canada.

See also

 Paederus dermatitis, a related beetle that can cause dermatitis

References

 Karl Wilhelm Harde, Frantisek Severa und Edwin Möhn: Der Kosmos Käferführer: Die mitteleuropäischen Käfer. Franckh-Kosmos Verlags-GmbH & Co KG, Stuttgart 2000, .
 A. Horion: Faunistik der mitteleuropäischen Käfer Band IX: Staphylinidae 1. Teil: Micropeplinae bis Euaesthetinae, Verlagsdruckerei Ph. C. W. Schmidt, Neustadt a.d. Aisch, 1963.
 Edmund Reitter: Fauna Germanica – Die Käfer des Deutschen Reiches. 5 Bände, Stuttgart K. G. Lutz 1908–1916, Digitale Bibliothek Band 134, Directmedia Publishing GmbH, Berlin 2006, 

Staphylinidae
Beetles of Europe
Beetles described in 1799